Eremocossus nubica is a moth in the family Cossidae. It was described by Yakovlev in 2008. It is found in Sudan.

References

Natural History Museum Lepidoptera generic names catalog

Cossinae
Moths described in 2008
Moths of Africa